Emma Eleonore Meyer (20 August 1859, Flensborg - 8 October 1921, Frederiksberg) was a Danish painter; primarily of landscapes.

Life and work
She was born to Fritz Meyer, a tax assessor, and his wife, Marie Frederikke née Dalberg. She began studying art at the drawing and painting school for women, operated by Emilie Mundt and Marie Luplau.

Most of her landscape motifs are taken from the area around Silkeborg. She also painted flowers and portraits. Her painting of women working at the Royal Porcelain Factory was displayed at the Charlottenborg exhibition of 1895, and purchased by the art association. From 1885 until her death, she held numerous showings at the Kunsthal Charlottenborg. Her painting of women working at the Royal Porcelain Factory was displayed there in 1895, and purchased by the art association. That same year, she participated in the Women's Exhibition, in Copenhagen.

Shortly after, she was awarded a scholarship from the Royal Danish Academy of Fine Arts. She made several short trips abroad and, in 1901, received an incentive award from the Frederik Sødring Endowment. In 1916, she was given a lifetime grant from the Louise Ravn-hansen Fund. Many of her works may be seen at the Vejle Kunstmuseum.

References

 "Meyer, Emma Eleonore", In: Hans Vollmer (Ed.): Allgemeines Lexikon der Bildenden Künstler von der Antike bis zur Gegenwart, Vol.24: Mandere–Möhl. E. A. Seemann, Leipzig 1930, pg.470

External links

 More works by Meyer @ ArtNet

Danish women artists
1859 births
1921 deaths
Danish women painters